The 2015–16 Skeleton World Cup was a multi-race tournament over a season for skeleton. The season started on 27 November 2015 in Altenberg, Germany, and ended on 28 February 2016 in Königssee, Germany. The World Cup was organised by the IBSF (formerly the FIBT) who also run World Cups and Championships in bobsleigh. The season was sponsored by BMW.

Calendar

Results

Men

Women

Standings

Men

Women

References

External links 
 International Bobsleigh and Skeleton Federation

Skeleton World Cup
2015 in skeleton
2016 in skeleton